Shawn Lawrence Otto (born April 21, 1961) is an American novelist, nonfiction author, filmmaker, political strategist, speaker, science advocate, and screenwriter and co-producer of the 2003 film House of Sand and Fog.

Biography

Otto lives on a hobby farm near Marine on St. Croix with his wife, Rebecca Otto, a former Minnesota State Auditor and 2018 candidate for Governor. Their home, called "Breezy", is passive and active solar, geothermal, wind-powered, and super-insulated.  Otto designed it, and the couple built it with their own hands.  Otto's family forefather, C.D. Gilfillan, co-founded the Republican Party of Minnesota.

Otto is a past (2009–2011) Board Chair of the Loft Literary Center in Minneapolis.

Works
 Otto is the author of Sins of Our Fathers, a critically acclaimed novel published in 2014 that received a starred review by Publishers Weekly and was a finalist for the Los Angeles Times Book Prize.
 Otto is the screenwriter and coproducer of the DreamWorks 2003 movie House of Sand and Fog which starred Ben Kingsley and Jennifer Connelly and garnered three Academy Award Nominations.
 Otto's 2011 book Fool Me Twice: Fighting The Assault On Science In America received starred reviews from both Kirkus and Publishers Weekly.
 Otto's 2016 book The War on Science: Who's Waging It, Why It Matters, What We Can Do About It, with a foreword by Lawrence M. Krauss, discusses three well-funded aspects of the war on science that impact public policy: identity politics, ideology, and industrialization. The book won the Minnesota Book Award for General Nonfiction, in 2017. 
 Otto has his own blog, Neorenaissance, and blogs regularly on Huffington Post.
 Otto's work has been published in Science, Salon.com, Huffington Post, MinnPost.com, Issues in Science & Technology, New Scientist, Scientific American, and other outlets.

Science debate
During the Hollywood writers' strike in 2007 and 2008, Otto co-founded and became the CEO of the Science Debate 2008. Presidential candidates Barack Obama and John McCain participated in the debate.

Notable public appearances
Otto delivered keynotes at the 45th annual Nobel Conference, on "Democracy in the Age of Science", at the United States National Academies, on "Examining the Mistrust of Science,", the New York Academy of Sciences, the EuroScience Open Forum (ESOF), the European Conference of Science Journalists, and countless other conferences and colleges and universities. He has discussed science and politics on National Public Radio's Talk of the Nation: Science Friday several times and on television and radio throughout the world.

Awards and honors
 Otto's 2016 book The War on Science: Who's Waging It, Why It Matters, What We Can Do About It won the Minnesota Book Award for General Nonfiction, in 2017.
 Otto's book Fool Me Twice won the 2012 Minnesota Book Award for non-fiction.
 His film House of Sand and Fog was nominated for three Academy Awards.
 Otto's first screenplay, Shining White, won the Heathcote Award, the McKnight Artist Fellowship and the Barry Morrow Fellowship. 
 He is a PEN Center USA Literary Awards finalist in screenwriting for House of Sand and Fog.
 He is an Alfred P. Sloan Foundation Fellow for his project Hubble.
 Otto is a National Merit Scholar, a member of Mensa, a member of the Society of Environmental Journalists and an Eagle Scout.

References

External links 
 
Blog Neorenaissance

Living people
American male screenwriters
American political consultants
Mensans
People from Washington County, Minnesota
Spouses of Minnesota politicians
American male novelists
American filmmakers
1961 births
21st-century American novelists
Screenwriters from Minnesota
21st-century American screenwriters
21st-century American male writers